Hugo Hamilton may refer to:

 Hugh Hamilton, 1st Viscount of Glenawly (c. 1600–1678), Scottish soldier in Swedish service
 Baron Hugo Hamilton (died 1724), Swedish military commander 
 Hugo Hamilton (writer) (born 1953), Irish writer
 Hugo E. G. Hamilton (1849–1928), Swedish politician, Speaker of Första kammaren 1916–28